NBA ShootOut '97 (Total NBA '97 in Europe) is a sports video game developed by SCE Studios Soho and published by Sony Computer Entertainment exclusively for the PlayStation in 1997. It is the second installment of the NBA ShootOut series. The cover features Eddie Jones of the Los Angeles Lakers.

Gameplay
ShootOut 97 features rosters from the 1996–97 NBA season. However, the game does not include Michael Jordan, Charles Barkley and Shaquille O'Neal, as they were replaced with custom players named "Roster Guard", "Roster Forward" and "Roster Center" respectively.

Reception

Most critics hailed NBA ShootOut '97 as a dramatic improvement over the original. Kraig Kujawa and Dean Hager of Electronic Gaming Monthly praised the faster game speed and new icon passing system. Kujawa wrote a longer review of the game for GameSpot, in which he additionally complimented the authentic NBA sounds and visuals and criticized the small play book. GamePro gave it a 3.5 out of 5 in sound and a perfect 5.0 in every other category (graphics, control, and fun factor), saying that it "shakes up the basketball world, cooking the court with spectacular, slam-dunkin' gameplay and the most realistic five-on-five hoops action ever brought to the 32-bit arena." Like Kujawa and Hager, they highly approved of the icon passing system. A Next Generation critic called the game "the first true basketball simulation for a console", elaborating that unlike previous basketball video games, the statistics have a significant impact on how players perform in actual gameplay. He also commented positively on the icon passing, but said the game was not as fun as NBA In the Zone 2 due to the controls, explaining that "the game has an almost clinical feel, almost as if the player isn't really affecting the outcome of plays."

The game held an 87%, based on five reviews, on the review aggregation website GameRankings. In Japan, where the game was released under the name , on June 27, 1997, Famitsu gave it a score of 27 out of 40.

References

External links

1997 video games
Multiplayer and single-player video games
National Basketball Association video games
PlayStation (console) games
PlayStation (console)-only games
Sony Interactive Entertainment games
Team Soho games
Video games developed in the United Kingdom
Video games scored by Richard Joseph